In the field of storage area networks, the iSCSI Management API (IMA) is a SNIA's standard for managing both iSCSI initiators and hosts containing them.

References 

SCSI
Storage area networks

fr:ISCSI Management API